Clube Desportivo Candal is a Portuguese sports club from Candal, Vila Nova de Gaia.

The men's football team played on the fourth tier in the 2009–10 and 2010–11 Terceira Divisão, and also played in the Taça de Portugal the same seasons.

References

Football clubs in Portugal
Association football clubs established in 1904
1904 establishments in Portugal